SDA Bocconi School of Management (SDA standing for Scuola di Direzione Aziendale) is the graduate business school of Bocconi University. It is the leading School of Management in Italy and also stands among the top-ranked European institutions.
SDA Bocconi offers executive, custom and MBA programs, as well as specialized masters, and regularly takes on research projects on commission. SDA Bocconi School of Management also has an offshore presence in Mumbai, India called the SDA Bocconi Asia Center.

In 1998, SDA Bocconi was the first school in Italy to be accredited by EQUIS and is now one of only 100 business schools worldwide to hold the "triple crown", having been accredited by three international accreditation associations:  AACSB, EQUIS and AMBA (Association of MBAs). The School has also been accredited by CSQNet and holds the ISO 9001:2000 quality rating from the Funded Projects Services Center.

Memberships 

SDA Bocconi is a member of the European Foundation for Management Development, AACSB International (Association to Advance Collegiate Schools of Business), EABIS (The Academy of Business in Society), ECGI (European Corporate Governance Institute), PIM (Partnership in International Management), CEMS (Community of European Management Schools and International Companies) – the last two alongside Bocconi University – and ASFOR (Associazione Italiana per la Formazione Manageriale), European Doctoral Programmes Association in Management & Business Administration (EDAMBA).

DBA program 

SDA Bocconi offers a 3-year DBA program.

MBA programs 

SDA Bocconi offers four MBA programs:
 Full-Time MBA
 Global Executive MBA
 Executive MBA
 Executive MBA weekend

Full-time MBA 

A 12-month full-time program in general management, taught in English. The course is designed for professionals with a few years’ industry experience and is open to students from all over the world. SDA Bocconi MBA structure is organized around three cornerstones: Planning and Innovation, Leading people and Processes, Controlling and Investment. These core courses represent the competence requirements of a global manager. Students spend the first eight months of the program taking foundation courses and developing management skills followed by a two-month real-world, hands-on experience (individual internship or group consulting project), plus final Concentrations.

In addition to 4 functional-based Concentrations, such as Finance, Innovation, Entrepreneurship and Marketing, the Program offers participants the possibility to further personalize their development by choosing the sector-based Track in Luxury Business Management (LBM) in partnership with LVMH, the renowned leader in the worldwide luxury business. The last part of the MBA will take place in the Arrivederci Week: Arts and Business, Telco and New media, Government-related finance, Pharma and Health, and first-hand “Made in Italy” business models. As a major international school of management, SDA Bocconi is engaged in an active and prestigious network of exchanges, collaborations and interactions with peer institutions.

Global executive MBA 

A 20-month international executive program in general management that combines distance learning modules and class-based lessons. Taught entirely in English, the Global Executive MBA includes 3 months at partner business schools abroad (UCLA Anderson School of Management, Fudan University, Copenhagen Business School) and offers the possibility to follow elective courses while abroad through partner organizations.

Executive MBA 

A 21-month executive program in general management taught in Italian.

Master programs

Full-time international masters 

All full-time international master programs last one year and are taught in English. In addition class-based lessons, they include seminars, group projects and field-based projects. The international Master programs cover the following:
 Corporate Finance
 Fashion, Experience & Design Management
 Arts Management and Administration
 Health Care Management, Economics and Policy
 Public Management
 Masters in International Arts Management,  delivered jointly with HEC Montreal and the Southern Methodist University, with 1/3 of the year in Montreal, 1/3 in Dallas and 1/3 in Milan

Full-time masters 

Full-time master programs last one year and are taught in Italian. The courses include class-based lessons, work placements and field-projects. They cover the following subject areas:
 Real Estate (in collaboration with MIP School of Management)
 Healthcare Management
 Management of Social Enterprises, non-profit Organizations and Cooperatives
 Strategic and Entrepreneurial Management

Executive international masters 

Executive masters combine class-based lessons with distance learning. The courses are taught in English and cover the following:
 Marketing & Sales
The school also offers a joint international executive master in Marketing & Sales degree in partnership with ESADE Business School in Barcelona.

Executive masters 

Executive masters are taught in Italian and are designed to allow participants to continue working while taking a specialist course in one of the following areas:
 Public Administration
 Management for Healthcare and Social Care Providers
 Finance

Executive open programs and custom projects 

Open programs are aimed at managers with different degrees of experience and responsibility working in one of the following fields: large corporations, banks, insurance and financial intermediaries, fashion and design, healthcare, non-profit organizations, small and medium-size businesses, public administration, real estate, sport and tourism.
As well as being sector-specific, the programs are designed based on different job functions: administration and control, corporate finance, marketing, sales, communication and distribution, organization, human resources, risk management, information systems, strategy and entrepreneurship, technology and operations. There are also more generic programs covering areas such as general management, project management, quantitative methods and leadership.
Class-based lessons are combined with individual assessments, study tours, distance learning, role playing, experiential learning, web-based simulations, field visits, company visits, tutoring and coaching.

In addition to the 200 Executive Open Programs aimed at Italian professionals, the school has designed a number of International Executive Open Programs on subjects such as finance, retail management, marketing and communication. Some of these have been developed in collaboration with institutions, sponsors and international trade associations.

To address the specific needs of companies and organizations, the school has developed what they call the Modello di Corporate Empowerment (i.e. Corporate Empowerment Model), designed especially to create custom programs that are able to strengthen and value organizations. These programs are run by three divisions, each dedicated to one of the School's main target sectors. The divisions are: DIM, for businesses, DIBA (Divisione Banche, Assicurazioni e Intermediari Finanziari), for banks, insurance companies and financial intermediaries, and DAP (Divisione Amministrazioni Pubbliche, Sanità e non profit), for public administration, healthcare and non-profit organizations.

Rankings 

In 2020, SDA Bocconi was ranked 3rd in the 2020 Financial Times' European Business School Ranking and 7th in the world for business and management studies by QS World University Rankings. In 2019, SDA Bocconi was ranked 3rd in the 2019 Financial Times' European Business School Ranking and 8th in the world for business and management studies by QS World University Rankings. In 2022, the Financial Times also ranked SDA Bocconi's MBA program 13th in world while Forbes in 2017 ranked SDA Bocconi as having the 5th best one-year international MBA programs in the world.

Research 

The Research Division, founded 22 years ago by Prof. Claudio Demattè, uses the outcomes of the latest studies to address the needs  of managers working in companies and in financial and public institutions.   Research projects can take one of the following shapes:
 Custom research projects
 Academic research projects
 Labs

Alumni Association 

Alumni from SDA Bocconi and the other Bocconi schools are all members of the Bocconi Alumni Association. As of September 2015, the Alumni Association is composed of over 95,000 active alumni, 12,000 of which are from SDA Bocconi. The Bocconi alumni network is active in over 110 countries in the world.

References 

Bocconi University
Universities and colleges in Milan
Educational institutions established in 1971
Business schools in Italy
Universities in Italy
1971 establishments in Italy